Bhagyalaxmi (International Title: Lady Luck) is a daily soap opera that airs  on Zee Network's Hindi entertainment channel &TV. It premiered on 2 March 2015 and ran till 1 January 2016.

A second season of the show, post a generation leap, was aired on the same channel and time slot of 8pm from 4 January 2016 and was titled Saubhagyalakshmi.

Plot 
Bhoomi Agrawal is a bubbly young woman, who wants to be independent in life. She is forced to choose her personal or professional life after marrying Anshuman Prajapati, the son of a rich traditional family. Through a twist of events, Bhoomi is assumed dead, but in fact alive, she hires a woman, Divya Nair, to take her responsibilities in Prajapati household, as she doesn't want them to know about her death. Divya and Maan pretend to the family that Divya is in fact Bhoomi as Bhoomi's death was likely to destroy the entire family. However, as Maan and Divya start falling in love though unable to forget Bhoomi, Maan accepts his feelings for Divya later they consummate their relationship. Divya's former husband Yuvraj who used to abuse her. threatens to destroy their happy family to get Divya back who has now built a relationship with Maan. Meanwhile, the real Bhoomi who is shown to be in a coma in a critical condition , gives birth to her and Maan's daughter Muskaan.

Maan and Divya continue keeping her secret from the Prajapati family. Divya becomes pregnant with Maan's child but Yuvraj returns and vows to destroy the Prajapati Family. The show ends with Yuvraj murdering all the members of the Prajapati family except Badi Maa who survived at the shootout. Badi Maa is shocked when Yuvraj exposes Divya's true identity of not being the real Bhoomi. After Yuvraj shoots Maan and Divya, Badi Maa manages to kill him. A dying Divya gives birth to a daughter. Badi Maa, despite her hate for Divya and that her past life brought a disaster for her family, decides to leave with Muskaan and her other granddaughter (Divya's daughter) who she sees as Maan's blood.

Cast

Main
Varun Sharma as Anshumaan "Maan" Prajapati: Lata and Agreem's son; Vasundhara and Manav's nephew; Surbhi and Pavitra's brother; Aryamaan's cousin; Bhoomi and Divya's husband; Muskaan and Kavya's father; Kuhu's uncle (2015–2016)
Simran Pareenja as Bhoomi Agrawal Prajapati: Damini and Milind's daughter; Shanti's grand-daughter; Murlimohan, Govind and Rita's niece; Varun's cousin; Anshumaan's first wife; Lata and Agreem's daughter-in-law; Surbhi and Pavitra's sister-in-law; Muskaan's mother; Kuhu's aunt (2015–2016)
Anupriya Kapoor as Divya Nair Malhotra/Prajapati: Yuvraj's ex-wife; Anshuman's second wife; Lata and Agreem's daughter-in-law; Surbhi and Pavitra's sister-in-law; Kavya's mother; Kuhu's aunt (2015–2016)

Recurring
Aruna Irani as Badi Maa/Vasundhara Prajapati: Matriarch of the Prajapati family; Agreem's sister-in-law; Manav's wife; Aryamaan's mother; Anshumaan, Surbhi and Pavitra's aunt (2015–2016)
Sara Khan as Pavitra Prajapati Shukla: Lata and Agreem's daughter; Vasundhara and Manav's niece; Surbhi and Anshuman's sister; Divya, Bhoomi and Suman's sister-in-law; Aryamaan's cousin; Varun's second wife; Kuhu's mother; Muskaan and Kavya's aunt (2015–2016)
Chetan Hansraj/Manish Goel as Yuvraj Malhotra: Divya's first husband (2015–2016)
Barkha Singh as Surbhi Prajapati Shukla: Lata and Agreem's daughter; Pavitra and Anshuman's sister; Divya, Bhoomi and Suman's sister-in-law; Vasundhara and Manav's niece; Aryamaan's cousin; Varun's second wife; Muskaan, Kavya and Kuhu's aunt (2015–2016)
Abhishek Malik as Varun Shukla: Murli Mohan's son; Damini and Milind's nephew; Shanti's grandson; Bhoomi's cousin; Surbhi and Pavitra's husband; Kuhu's father (2015–2016)
Ashita Dhawan as Suman Prajapati: Aryamaan's wife; Vasundhara and Manav's daughter-in-law (2015–2016)
Ali Raza Namdaar as Agreem Prajapati: Manav's brother; Lata's husband; Vasundhara's brother-in-law; Anshumaan, Surbhi and Pavitra's father; Aryamaan's uncle; Muskaan, Kavya and Kuhu's grandfather (2015–2016)
Shweta Gautam as Lata Prajapati: Agreem's wife; Manav's sister-in-law; Anshumaan, Surbhi and Pavitra's mother; Aryamaan's aunt; Muskaan, Kavya and Kuhu's grandmother (2015–2016)
Anil Dhawan as Murli Mohan Shukla: Shanti's son; Damini's brother; Varun's father; Milind's brother-in-law; Bhoomi's uncle; Kuhu's grandfather (2015)
Rita Bhaduri as Shanti Shukla
Chetanya Adib as Milind Kumar Agrawal
Sanjeev Jotangia as Govind Kumar Agrawal
Shalini Arora as Rita Agrawal
Akanksha Chamola as Avni Chouhan
Sumit Verma as Vikram Chouhan
Gulfam Khan as Kaveri

References

External links
Bhagyalakshmi on Zee5
Bhagyalakshmi on Youtube

Hindi-language television shows
&TV original programming
2015 Indian television series debuts
2016 Indian television series endings